Ran is a given name and nickname which may refer to:

Given name
 Ran Abukarat (רן אבוקרט‎, born 1988), Israeli retired footballer
 Ran Blake (born 1935), American pianist, composer and educator
 Ran Cohen (רן כהן‎, born 1937), Israeli politician
 Ran Dank (born 1982), Israeli classical pianist
 Ran Hirschl (רן הירשל, born 1963), Canadian political scientist and professor
 Ran Hwang (born 1960), South Korean artist
 , Japanese actress and member of the 1970s idol group Candies
 Ran Kadoch (רן קדוש, born 1985), Israeli football goalkeeper
 Ran Raz (רָן רָז), Israeli computer scientist
 Ran Rol, Israeli footballer
 Ran Ronen-Pekker (1936–2016), Israeli Air Force brigadier general and fighter ace
 Sui Ran (睢冉, born 1992), Chinese basketball player
 , Japanese volleyball player
 Ran Torten (רן טורטן, born 1966), Israeli Olympic competitive sailor
 Ran Vijay Singh (1932–1971), Indian Navy rear admiral

Nickname
 Ran Carthon (born 1981), American National Football League player
 Ran Danker (born 1984) Israeli actor, singer and model
 Ran Laurie (1915–1998), English physician and Olympic rowing champion, father of actor Hugh Laurie

Fictional characters

 Ran Mouri, a character in the manga and anime series Case Closed
 Ran Ayukawa, a character in the tokusatsu series B-Fighter Kabuto
 Ran Haitani, a character in the manga and anime series Tokyo Revengers
 Ran Hanamichi, a character in the anime series Delicious Party Pretty Cure
 Ran Himeno, a character in the tokusatsu series Ohsama Sentai King-Ohger
 Ran Uzaki, a character in the tokusatsu series Juken Sentai Gekiranger

Lists of people by nickname
Japanese feminine given names